islom imomnazarov
Seoul University of Buddhism is a university and graduate school in South Korea. It is headquartered in Geumcheon-gu, Seoul Metropolitan City and was established in 2002.

References

External links 
 http://www.sub.ac.kr/

Universities and colleges in Seoul
2002 establishments in South Korea
Educational institutions established in 2002
Buddhist universities and colleges in South Korea
Buddhism in Seoul